"Who's That Girl" is a song by American singer Madonna from the soundtrack album of the 1987 film, Who's That Girl. It was released on June 23, 1987, by Sire Records as the first album single. While shooting for the film, then called Slammer, Madonna had requested Patrick Leonard to develop an uptempo song that captured the nature of her film persona. She later added the lyrics and vocals to the demo tape developed by Leonard, and decided to rename the song as well as the film to "Who's That Girl".

Featuring instrumentation from drums, bass, and stringed instruments, "Who's That Girl" continued Madonna's fascination with Hispanic culture by incorporating Spanish lyrics and using the effect of double vocals. Critical reception was mixed to positive; some critics compared it to Madonna's previous single, "La Isla Bonita", while others found it forgettable. "Who's That Girl" became Madonna's sixth single to top the Billboard Hot 100, while peaking atop the charts in countries like the United Kingdom, Canada, Netherlands, Italy, Ireland and Belgium. It was also nominated for "Best Song Written for Visual Media" at the 1988 Grammy Awards and "Best Original Song" at the 1988 Golden Globe Awards.

The music video portrayed a different persona of Madonna, rather than her film character for which it was released. She's seen as a young boyish lady in search of a treasure. Madonna has performed the song on her Who's That Girl (1987) and Rebel Heart (2015–2016) tours. The song has been covered by many artists and has appeared in compilations and tribute albums. Despite being a worldwide number-one hit, the song was not included in Madonna's 1990 greatest hits album The Immaculate Collection, but was later included on her 2009 greatest hits album Celebration.

Background and composition 
In 1986, Madonna was shooting for her third motion picture Who's That Girl, known at the time as Slammer. Needing songs for the soundtrack of the movie, she contacted Patrick Leonard and Stephen Bray, who had written and produced her third studio album True Blue in 1986. Madonna explained to them that she needed an uptempo song and a downtempo song. She came to the studio one Thursday as Leonard developed the chorus of the song. He handed over that cassette to Madonna, who went to the backroom and finished the melody and the lyrics of the song, while Leonard worked on the other parts of the song.

After finishing the lyrics, Madonna declared that she wanted the song to be named "Who's That Girl" and changed the movie to the same, rather than Slammer, considering it to be a better title. In Fred Bronson's The Billboard Book of Number 1 Hits book, Leonard explained that the song was recorded in one day with Madonna adding her vocals only once. Additional instrumental tracks with guitars and percussion were included by Leonard and Bray later. Regarding the development of the music for the film, Madonna further explained
"I had some very specific ideas in mind, music that would stand on its own as well as support and enhance what was happening on screen and the only way to make that a reality was to have a hand in writing the tunes myself. [...] The songs aren't necessarily about Nikki [her character name in the movie] or written to be sung by someone like her, but there's a spirit to this music that captures both what the film and the characters are about, I think."

The song is composed in Madonna's typical style—mingling the drum machine, a bass synth line, and the sound of stringed instruments. The three parts of the song, namely the bridge, where Madonna sings "what can help me now", the chorus and the verse flow together strongly. The chorus has a haunting effect in it. According to the sheet music published at Musicnotes.com, the song is composed in common time in the key of A minor, and performed at a medium tempo of 104 beats per minute. The song follows a basic chord progression sequence of Am9–G–Csus2–Am9–G–Dm and Madonna's vocals range from G3 to B4.

The song epitomizes Madonna's interest with Hispanic culture that continued after the release of "La Isla Bonita", by adding Spanish phrases in the chorus and over the trumpets of the second verse, and also by the added instrumental break in the middle. It also uses the sonic effect brought about by the combination of multiple vocal lines, which had been previously used by groups like The Beach Boys in their singles "God Only Knows" (1966) and "I Get Around" (1964) as well as R.E.M.'s singles "Fall on Me" (1986) and "Near Wild Heaven" (1991). "Who's That Girl" employs this effect on the last chorus where three or four different vocal hooks are intertwined.

Critical reception

In his book The Complete Guide to the Music of Madonna, author Rikky Rooksby explained that the song was Madonna's best take on her original music style. Stephen Thomas Erlewine of AllMusic commented that "Who's That Girl" along with "Causing a Commotion" were not amongst Madonna's best singles. Similar thoughts were shared by Medium's Richard LaBeau. Biographer J. Randy Taraborrelli, in his book Madonna: An Intimate Biography called the song "quintessential Madonna music" and went on to describe it as "funky, sassy and melodic, with a Latin accent". Writing for Slant Magazine, Ed Gonzalez hailed it a "calorie-free palate cleanser after the delectable voluptuousness of 'La Isla Bonita' [...] the music is catchy without ever stepping outside any norm". Rolling Stone called it "a bright dance-popper that fared much better than the lackluster film it was tied to". Noah Robischon from Entertainment Weekly opined that with both the song and the movie, Madonna had pushed "synergy over the borderline". From the same magazine, Chuck Arnold wrote: "The most memorable thing about Madonna’s 1987 comedy is the chart-topping title tune of its soundtrack. While it’s not quite in the league of its obvious inspiration, 'La Isla Bonita', this tropical delight is pure enchantment". Online magazine Queerty called it "simple enough for [Madonna] to perform convincingly and catchy enough for fans to remember".

Louis Virtel from The Backlot ranked it at number 61 on a list for "The 100 Greatest Madonna Songs", and called it "a sexy little tribute to those minxes you just can’t catch up with". Enio Chiola of PopMatters.com listed "Who's That Girl" as one of the top-fifteen singles of Madonna's career, stating that it is an "insta-party from the moment in begins". In August 2018, Billboard ranked it as the singer's 62nd greatest song; Andrew Unterberger opined that it "expanded on the Spanglish hook and Latin-flavored pop bounce of 'La Isla Bonita' with a similarly contagious chorus and sparkling production from Madonna and Patrick Leonard". Jude Rogers from The Guardian felt that "as Balearic moments go, 'La Isla Bonita' was better". Writing for Gay Star News, Joe Morgan said that it was "not the best time we saw her Spanish influence, but it certainly wasn’t the worst. Great fun song, but a bit forgettable". Matthew Jacobs from HuffPost, placed it at number 52 of his list "The Definitive Ranking Of Madonna Singles" and called it "Madonna’s least-remembered No. 1 hit". On 2019, Samuel R. Murrian from Parade ranked it at number 32 on his list of the singer's 100 greatest songs: "it doesn't hold up as well as some of her mightier songs of the era like 'La Isla Bonita' or 'Open Your Heart'” "Who's That Girl" was nominated for a Grammy Award for Best Song Written for Visual Media at the 30th ceremony and for the Golden Globe Award for Best Original Song at the 45th ceremony.

Commercial reception
"Who's That Girl" was released in the United States in June 1987. It debuted on the Billboard Hot 100 at number 43, reached the top of the chart in its seventh week, maintained the top position for one week, and spent 16 weeks on the chart. It became Madonna's sixth number-one single in the United States, making her the first artist to accumulate six number-one singles in the 1980s, and the first female performer to get that many number-ones as a solo act. The song peaked at number 44 on the Hot Dance Club Play chart. In 2000, the song came tenth in a vote conducted to determine the favourite Madonna song. In Canada, the song debuted at number 83 on the RPM singles chart on July 11, 1987, reached the top for one week on August 29, 1987, and stayed on the chart for 23 weeks. It placed at number 12 on the RPM Year-end chart for 1987.

In the United Kingdom, "Who's That Girl" was released on July 14, 1987, and debuted at number three on the UK Singles Chart, climbing to number one the next week to become Madonna's fifth number-one single in the United Kingdom. According to the Official Charts Company, the song has sold 380,000 copies there. It received a silver certification from the British Phonographic Industry (BPI). In Italy, the song spent 11 consecutive weeks at the top of the Musica e dischi charts. Across Europe, "Who's That Girl" also topped the singles charts in Belgium, Ireland, and the Netherlands, as well as peaking in the top five in Austria, France, Germany, Norway, Spain, Sweden, and Switzerland. It was certified gold by the Syndicat National de l'Édition Phonographique for shipment of 500,000 copies in France.
The song also reached the Top 5 in New Zealand, and the Top 10 in Australia and South Africa.

Music video

The music video was shot over two days, at A&M Soundstages in Hollywood, California. Madonna had adopted a garish, platinum blond hairstyle for the Who's That Girl movie which was not used in the music video; instead, she sported brown hair. She appeared dressed boyishly in a fedora hat, an oversized grey jacket and short pants over a black bustier.

The music video, directed by Peter Rosenthal, begins with Madonna entering a park. After meeting two children and a teenage boy, they start roaming around the park, with Madonna singing the song. These scenes are interchanged with scenes from the motion picture, which show Madonna as the movie character Nikki Fynn. As the music video progresses, Madonna is shown to be in search of an Egyptian treasure casket. After being directed to it by a version of the High Priestess tarot card displaying her cartoon impersonation, Madonna opens it to find a huge diamond. She looks up happily to the children. The video ends with them continuing dancing and Madonna carrying away the casket.

The video portrayed a different image of Madonna rather than her real self. According to Vincent Canby of The New York Times, Madonna at that time was shrewdly pragmatic about her persona and appearance—resembling Marilyn Monroe, but with the "comic tartness" of Jean Harlow. This persona was reflected in the second half of the Who's That Girl film. However, the music video chose not to capture her real self and qualities, or to promote the movie for which it was specifically created. Instead, it concentrated on the humorous off-putting personality of Madonna's film character depicted in the first half of the film.

Live performances and covers

Madonna performed the song on two of her tours. On her 1987 Who's That Girl World Tour where it was performed as a part of the encore, Madonna came out on the stage in a bright red flamenco dress and performed the song, assisted by her backup singers Niki Haris, Donna De Lory, and Debra Parson. Two different performances of the song on this tour can be found on the videos: Who's That Girl: Live in Japan, filmed in Tokyo, Japan, on June 22, 1987, and Ciao Italia: Live from Italy, filmed in Turin, Italy, on September 4, 1987.  Almost 30 years later, Madonna performed an acoustic, guitar-driven version of the song during the Rebel Heart Tour (2015–16). The wardrobe for the performance consisted of a gypsy inspired ensemble, made up of shawl, lace gloves, long black skirt with silk fringes, a hat with silk flowers on it, and high-heeled knee-high lace-up leather boots. After the song, the singer admitted that it took her "a hell of a long time" to answer who the titular girl was in the song.

The song has been covered many times, mostly on tribute albums. In 1999, The Countdown Singers made a sound-alike cover version for the album Hit Parade of 80's, Vol. 2. The Royal Philharmonic Orchestra (RPO) made an instrumental version of the song for the 1998 album Material Girl: RPO Plays Music of Madonna. In 2007, The Bubonic Plague recorded a cover of the song that was included on the tribute album Through the Wilderness.

Formats and track listing

US / European 7" Single
"Who's That Girl" (LP version) – 3:58
"White Heat" (LP version) – 4:40

UK 12" Single / Limited Edition 12" Picture Disc
"Who's That Girl" (extended version) – 6:29
"White Heat" (LP version) – 4:40

US 12" Single / UK Limited Edition 12"
"Who's That Girl" (extended version) – 6:29
"Who's That Girl" (dub version) – 5:07
"White Heat" (LP version) – 4:40

Germany / UK CD Maxi Single (1995)'''
"Who's That Girl" (Extended Version) – 6:29
"White Heat" (LP version) – 4:40

Credits and personnel
Madonna – lyrics, producer, vocals
Patrick Leonard – lyrics, producer
Michael Barbiero – additional production, audio mixing
Steve Thompson – additional production, audio mixing

Credits adapted from the album's liner notes.

Charts

Weekly charts

Year-end charts

Decade-end charts

Certifications and sales

See also
List of number-one hits (Belgium)
List of Billboard Hot 100 number-one singles of 1987
List of number-one singles of 1987 (Canada)
List of Dutch Top 40 number-one singles of 1987
List of number-one singles of 1987 (Ireland)
List of number-one hits of 1987 (Italy)
List of UK Singles Chart number ones of the 1980s
List of Cash Box Top 100 number-one singles of 1987

Notes

References

Film theme songs
1987 songs
1987 singles
Madonna songs
Billboard Hot 100 number-one singles
Cashbox number-one singles
Dutch Top 40 number-one singles
Irish Singles Chart number-one singles
Macaronic songs
Spanglish songs
Number-one singles in Belgium
Number-one singles in Italy
Number-one singles in Portugal
Number-one singles in Spain
Oricon International Singles Chart number-one singles
RPM Top Singles number-one singles
Songs written for films
Songs written by Madonna
Songs written by Patrick Leonard
UK Singles Chart number-one singles
Song recordings produced by Madonna
Song recordings produced by Patrick Leonard